is the head shrine of the kami Inari, located in Fushimi-ku, Kyoto, Kyoto Prefecture, Japan.

Inari was originally and remains primarily the kami of rice and agriculture, but merchants and manufacturers also worship Inari as the patron of business. Each of Fushimi Inari-taisha's roughly thousand torii was donated by a Japanese business.

Owing to the popularity of Inari's division and re-enshrinement, this shrine is said to have as many as 32,000 sub-shrines (分社 bunsha) throughout Japan.

History

The shrine became the object of imperial patronage during the early Heian period.  In 965, Emperor Murakami decreed that messengers carry written accounts of important events to the guardian kami of Japan. These heihaku were initially presented to 16 shrines, including the Inari Shrine.

Structures
The earliest structures were built in 711 on the Inariyama hill in southwestern Kyoto, but the shrine was re-located in 816 on the request of the monk Kūkai.  The main shrine structure was built in 1499. 

Senbon Torii 
The highlight of the shrine is the rows of torii gates, known as  The custom to donate a torii began spreading from the Edo period (1603–1868) to have a wish come true or in gratitude for a wish that came true, with successive gates being added up to the present day by donors out of gratitude. Along the main path there are around 1,000 torii gates.

Fox
Foxes (kitsune), regarded as the messengers, are often found in Inari shrines. One attribute is a key (for the rice granary) in their mouths.

Unlike most Shinto shrines, Fushimi Inari-taisha, in keeping with typical Inari shrines, has an open view of the main object of worship (a mirror).

A drawing in Kiyoshi Nozaki's Kitsune: Japan's Fox of Mystery, Romance and Humor in 1786 depicting the shrine says that its two-story entry gate was built by Toyotomi Hideyoshi.

The shrine draws several million worshipers over the Japanese New Year, 2.69 million for 3 days in 2006 reported by the police, the most in western Japan.

Access
The shrine is just outside the Inari Station on the Nara Line of the West Japan Railway Company (JR), a five-minute ride from Kyoto Station. It is a short walk from Fushimi-Inari Station on the Main Line of the Keihan Electric Railway.

The shrine is open 24 hours with both the approach to the shrine and the  itself illuminated all night. There is no entrance fee.

Environs
In the approach to the shrine are a number of sweet shops selling , a form of fortune cookie dating at least to the 19th century, and which are believed by some to be the origin of the American fortune cookie.

In popular culture

Memoirs of a Geisha (2005)
Aria the Natural ep. 5 (2006)
Inari, Konkon, Koi Iroha (2010)
Rurouni Kenshin, site of Makoto Shishio's base
Kamen Rider Fourze ep. 33 (2012)
Samsara (2011 film) (2011)
High School Inari Tamamo-chan' ', where the main character a fox spirit came from along with her siblings. 

A part of the Noh play Kokaji takes place in Fushimi Inari-taisha''.

Image gallery

See also

 List of Shinto shrines
 Modern system of ranked Shinto shrines
 Twenty-Two Shrines

References

Citations

Bibliography
 Breen, John and Mark Teeuwen. (2000).  Shinto in History: Ways of the Kami. Honolulu: University of Hawaii Press. 
 Nussbaum, Louis-Frédéric and Käthe Roth. (1998).  Japan encyclopedia.  Cambridge: Harvard University Press. 
 Ponsonby-Fane, Richard. (1962).   Studies in Shinto and Shrines. Kyoto: Ponsonby Memorial Society. OCLC 399449
 Ponsonby-Fane, Richard (1959).  The Imperial House of Japan. Kyoto: Ponsonby Memorial Society. OCLC 194887
 Smyers, Karen A. (1997). Inari pilgrimage: Following one’s path on the mountain, Japanese Journal of Religious Studies 24 (3–4), 427–452

External links

Official Site 
Official Site 
Photographs of Fushimi Inari-taisha
Accessibility information

Important Cultural Properties of Japan
Inari shrines
Shinto shrines in Kyoto
Kanpei-taisha